The Manitoba Arts Council (MAC) is a provincial crown corporation whose purpose is to promote the arts. The Council awards grants to professional artists and arts organizations in Manitoba in all art forms; it also provides related creative activity such as arts education.

The Council was founded in 1965 with the passage of An Act to Establish The Manitoba Arts Council and incorporated in 1967. (It now operates under the terms of The Arts Council Act.) Remaining at arm’s-length from the Government of Manitoba, it is funded by the Manitoba Sport, Culture and Heritage and reports annually to the Provincial Legislature through the Minister of Sport, Culture and Heritage in its annual report.

Governance
Today, the Council operates under the terms of The Arts Council Act, which was amended in 2017. Remaining at arm’s-length from the Government of Manitoba, it is funded by the Manitoba Sport, Culture and Heritage and reports annually to the Provincial Legislature through the Minister of Sport, Culture and Heritage in its annual report.

The Manitoba Arts Council consists of 9 board members who are appointed for a term by the Lieutenant-Governor-in-Council. The Executive Director is hired by the Council to carry out its policies and oversee operations.

Manitoba Arts Award of Distinction
The Manitoba Arts Award of Distinction is a CA$30,000 prize awarded every second year to an artist or arts professional for "artistic excellence and contribution to the development of the arts in Manitoba."

Recipients are selected by a multidisciplinary panel from nominations submitted by the community. The award process is administered and funded by the Council. Initially awarded annually, the award is now awarded biennially.

Prizes in the Arts
Four $10,000 Prizes in the Arts are awarded every two years, opposite of the Manitoba Arts Award of Distinction, recognizing artists or groups working in Manitoba in four categories:

 The Connecting Creative Communities Prize
 The Emerging Excellence Prize
 The Indigenous Full Circle Prize
 The Rural Recognition Prize

Recipients are selected by a multidisciplinary panel from nominations submitted by the community. The award process is administered and funded by the Council.

Operations and grants 
In the 2019/20 fiscal year, the Council funded 525 arts organizations and artistic projects, which made for a total of CA$8.3 million.

The following is the number of MAC-funded projects by region, per 10,000 population:

 Northern Manitoba (NorMan), 4.5
 Parkland, 2.6
 Interlake, 3.2 
 Westman, 2.6 
 Central Plains, 2.9 
 Pembina Valley, 2.8 
 Eastman, 1.6
 Winnipeg, 3.0

The Council's "Indigenous 360" funding stream offers three granting programs that support professional Indigenous artists, arts/cultural professionals, Knowledge Keepers, art groups, and organizations from Manitoba. In the fall of 2018, the Council began collecting information on the background and identity of individual applicants—this includes Indigenous, visible minorities, females, non-binary, and Francophone applicants, as well as applicants who live with a disability or mental illness or who are deaf.

*Special operating grant disbursed on behalf of Manitoba Sports, Culture, and Heritage.

References

External links
 
 The Arts Council Act

Arts councils of Canada
Crown corporations of Manitoba
Culture of Manitoba